Tanoh Rosalie Benie (born 21 December 1993, in Mpody-Anyama) is an Ivorian freestyle wrestler. She competed in the freestyle 48 kg event at the 2012 Summer Olympics and was eliminated in the 1/8 finals by Isabelle Sambou.

References

External links
 

1993 births
Living people
Ivorian female sport wrestlers
Olympic wrestlers of Ivory Coast
Wrestlers at the 2012 Summer Olympics